Adrià Pina (born 1959) is a Spanish painter from L'Alcudia, Valencia. Among his honors Pina received the X BMW Spanish painting prize in 1995.

Biography 

Adrià Pina was born in L'Alcùdia on March 5, 1959. He is characterized by a photorealistic language. He has exhibited in New York City, London, Seoul, Barcelona and Madrid.
In 1995 Pina received from the hands of H.M. Queen Sofía of Spain the Medal of Honor awarded to him as well as to another nine artists (including Fabio Hurtado, Elena Negueroles and Raúl Urrutikoetxea) at the 10th edition of the BMW painting prize award ceremony.

His art is a geometrically very definite smart and cheerful art that breathes fresh air, and seeks to capture a different reality which has led him to define a language and own style.

Designing the artwork is for Pina not only a feedback process between concept and object, but it also takes into account the viewer, with the intention of capture its attention, and reaching both fun as profound concepts.

References

External links 
Adrià Pina official website

Living people
20th-century Spanish painters
Spanish male painters
21st-century Spanish painters
Realist painters
1959 births
People from Valencia
21st-century Spanish male artists